Colin Chilvers (born 1945) is an English film director and special effects coordinator. He is known for his work on The Rocky Horror Picture Show (1975), Superman (1978), Condorman (1981), and X-Men (2000).

Chilvers directed the "Smooth Criminal" segment from Michael Jackson's Moonwalker. When working with Michael Jackson, Chilvers told Rolling Stone, "I showed Michael a movie that I felt would fit the theme of the piece, The Third Man. He loved the look of it, that sort of film-noir look, so we used that to get the camera man to light it in a similar way."

Chilvers won a Special Achievement Academy Award in 1979 for Superman.

Awards
 Winner of Special Achievement Academy Award 1979 for Superman
 Winner of BAFTA Outstanding British Contribution to Cinema Award 1979 for Superman 
 Nominated for Grammy Award 1989 for "Moonwalker"

References

External links
 
 
 Colin Chilvers technician videography - Music Video DataBase

Living people
Special effects coordinators
1945 births